Adeboyejo is a surname of Yoruba origin. Notable people with the surname include:

 Quincy Adeboyejo (born 1995), American football wide receiver
 Victor Adeboyejo (born 1998), Nigerian-English footballer

See also
 Adeboye

Yoruba-language surnames